90 Degrees East, also known as 90°E Lake, is a lake in Antarctica. It is named after the 90th meridian east, on which it lies.

See also
Lake Vostok
Sovetskaya (lake)

References

Lakes of Kaiser Wilhelm II Land